This is a list of when the first publicly announced television broadcasts occurred in the mentioned countries. Non-public field tests and closed circuit demonstrations are not included.

This list should not be interpreted to mean the whole of a country had television service by the specified date. For example, the United States, Great Britain, Germany, and the former Soviet Union all had operational television stations and a limited number of viewers by 1939. Very few cities in each country had television service. Television broadcasts were not yet available in most places.

History

1920s and 1930s

1940s

1950s

1960s

1970s

1980s

1990s

2000s and 2010s

See also

 History of television
 List of years in television
 Geographical usage of television
 Prewar television stations
 Timeline of the introduction of color television in countries
 Timeline of the introduction of radio in countries

Notes and citations

External links

Introduction timeline
Technology timelines
Introduction